The Shacolas Tower or "Ledras Tower"(Greek: Πύργος Σιακόλα) is a highrise building in Nicosia, Cyprus. It was completed in 1959. It was built by Costas Manglis and was formerly known as the Manglis Tower, which housed the offices of the General Engineering and Hellenic Mining Company. It is located in the old town of Nicosia and it was the tallest building in Cyprus until 1978. The first 5 floors are H&M department stores and the 6th floor used to be a cafeteria offering a panoramic view of the old city. The 11th floor is an observatory and museum overlooking the whole capital. There are telescopes, binoculars and a recorded feature on the history of the capital.

Museum and observatory
This museum combines a modern museum with the view of the entire city and is on the 11th floor of the Shacolas Tower. The exhibition - a cooperation with the Leventis Museum of Nicosia and the Debenhams Group - shows photographs and descriptions of Old Nicosia, a multilingual taped history and binoculars.

References 

Buildings and structures in Nicosia
Architecture in Cyprus
Office buildings completed in 1996
Skyscrapers in Cyprus
1996 establishments in Cyprus
Skyscraper office buildings